New York Mosque may refer to:

Park51, a planned Islamic mosque and cultural center to be located on Park Place.
Islamic Cultural Center of New York, on Third Avenue.

See also
List of mosques in the United States, which includes other mosques in New York State.